Józef Tejchma (14 July 1927 – 13 December 2021) was a Polish communist politician. A member of the Polish United Workers' Party, he served in the Sejm from 1957 to 1980 and was Deputy Prime Minister from 1972 to 1980.

References

1927 births
2021 deaths
People from Podkarpackie Voivodeship
Polish United Workers' Party members
Deputy Prime Ministers of Poland
Culture ministers of Poland
Education ministers of Poland